Dale Abbey is a civil parish in the Erewash district of Derbyshire, England.  The parish contains 20 listed buildings that are recorded in the National Heritage List for England.  Of these, three are listed at Grade I, the highest of the three grades, one is at Grade II*, the middle grade, and the others are at Grade II, the lowest grade.  The parish contains the village of Dale Abbey and the surrounding area.  The village gets its name from the abbey of the same name, which is in ruins.  The abbey ruins are listed, together with buildings in the village, including houses, farmhouses and farm buildings, and a church with an attached house.  To the north of the village is a post mill, which is listed together with two associated buildings.  To the west of the village is Locko Park, a country house, which is listed together with associated structures and items in its grounds.


Key

Buildings

References

Citations

Sources

 

Lists of listed buildings in Derbyshire